Elachista karsholti is a moth of the family Elachistidae. It is found in Austria.

References

karsholti
Moths described in 1992
Moths of Europe